The England cricket team represented England, Scotland and Wales in Test cricket. England played Australia in the first ever Test match, which took place at the Melbourne Cricket Ground in March 1877. Although four touring parties of English players had visited Australia prior to 1877, the Australian team had not previously been considered strong enough to play on equal terms. The two matches between the English cricketers and the Australians were retrospectively granted Test status.

Between 1877 and 1914, when competitive cricket was interrupted by the First World War, England played 123 Test matches, resulting in 59 victories, 22 draws and 42 defeats. For much of this period, England and Australia were the only Test playing countries and played each other every year or two. In 1888–89, England toured South Africa and played two matches subsequently deemed to be Test matches. Subsequently, the sides played each other sporadically and from 1906 fixtures were played as frequently as the Ashes series. In 1912, the three sides competed in a Triangular Tournament, which was deemed a failure, partly due to a damp English summer and in part because of the perceived complexity of the tournament.

Overall, by 1914, England had played 94 Test matches against Australia and 29 versus South Africa. England won 19 matches by an innings, with their largest victory being by an innings and 230 runs against Australia during the 1891–92 Ashes series, their eighth-best innings win of all time. Their largest victory by runs alone during this period was in 1896 against South Africa, when they won by 288 runs, while they won by 10 wickets on four occasions. England's victories by one wicket during this period are two of the three occasions that England have won by this margin in Test cricket, while their 10-run win over Australia during the 1894–95 Ashes series is their third-narrowest win by runs. In the first match of the 1886–87 Ashes series, England scored their lowest ever innings score in Test cricket, 45 runs. Despite that low score, they won the match by 13 runs.

Key

Matches

Summary

Notes

References

England in international cricket
England Test
Test